The Betrayal is a low-budget 1957 British film.

Plot
Michael McCall is a former World War II pilot who was blinded while imprisoned by the Nazis. While imprisoned he was betrayed by one of his fellow officers.  As he is now unable to identify the traitor by sight, McCall is aided in his search by model Janet Hillyer.

Cast
Michael McCall – Philip Friend
Janet Hillyer – Diana Decker
Bartel – Philip Saville
Inspector Baring – Peter Bathurst
Tony Adams – Peter Burton
Lawson – Ballard Berkeley
Clay – Harold Lang
War Crimes Commissioner – John Stuart
Freddie – Ferdy Mayne

References

External links

1957 films
1957 crime films
British crime films
British black-and-white films
Films shot at New Elstree Studios
1950s English-language films
Films directed by Ernest Morris
1950s British films